Harvest Christian Academy may refer to:

 Harvest Christian Academy, Ghana
 Harvest Christian Academy (Guam)
 Harvest Christian Academy (Honduras)
 Harvest Christian Academy (Illinois)

See also
 Harvest Time Christian Academy, Texas
 Harvest Christian School (est. 2000), Kadina, South Australia